Maine Tower is a 41-storey residential building located between Lighterman's Road and Dockyard Lane on the Isle of Dogs forming part of the Harbour Central development at Canary Wharf, London.

Maine Tower consists of 297 apartments with a price starting at £655,000 for a one-bedroom unit. Harbour Central will total 642 apartments across five buildings.

200 apartments offered for sale on 12 July 2015 sold out in five hours.

References

Skyscrapers in the London Borough of Tower Hamlets
Buildings and structures in the London Borough of Tower Hamlets
Buildings and structures under construction in the United Kingdom
Canary Wharf buildings